Arletta Duncan (31 December 1914 – 28 October 1985), was an American actress. After being selected from a photo contest, she attended Universal Pictures' "little red school house," a film school for aspiring actors and actresses. She was described as having blue eyes, brown hair and a sweet singing voice, and was rumored to be dating Tom Brown. She appeared in 11 films between 1931 and 1937.

Arletta died in Santa Ana, California.

Selected filmography
 Night World (1932)
 Back Street (1932)
 Fast Companions (1932)
 The Fighting Champ (1932)
 The Gallant Fool (1933)
 Unknown Blonde (1934)
 Teacher's Beau (short) (1935)
Mile-a-Minute-Love (1937)
 Damaged Goods (1937)

References

External links

1914 births
1985 deaths
American film actresses
20th-century American actresses